Montauk Chronicles is a 2014 documentary film from filmmaker Christopher P. Garetano. The film covers the alleged happenings in the Montauk Project conspiracy.

Overview 
Montauk Chronicles is the story of three men who claim that between 1971 and 1983 secret experiments were conducted deep beneath the surface of the Camp Hero Air Force base.

The film features interviews with Al Bielek, Stewart Swerdlow, and Preston Nichols.

In January 2015 Montauk Chronicles premiered at the Philip K. Dick Film Festival in New York and won the award for Best Feature Documentary/Singularity and Beyond.

In February 2015, Preston and Christopher were featured on the nationwide talk show Coast to Coast AM.

See also 
 List of conspiracy theories

References

External links 
 

2014 films
Documentary films about conspiracy theories
2010s English-language films